Heliconia psittacorum (parrot's beak, parakeet flower, parrot's flower, parrot's plantain, false bird-of-paradise) is a perennial herb native to the Caribbean and South America. It is considered native to French Guiana, Guyana, Suriname, Venezuela, Colombia, Bolivia, Brazil, Paraguay, Panama and Trinidad and Tobago. It is reportedly naturalized in Gambia, Thailand, Puerto Rico, Hispaniola, Jamaica and the Lesser Antilles. It is often cultivated as a tropical ornamental plant in regions outside its native range. 

Unlike most species of plants that require the use of pollinators for pollination the H. Psittacorum naturally prefers the absence of pollinators for pollination. In other words, it is well capable of pollinating itself, any use of pollinators can do more harm than good. The flower has both male parts (anthers) and female parts (stigma and pistil), also referred to as a hermaphroditic angiosperm.

References

External links
Heliconia psittacorum observations on iNaturalist
Line drawing of Heliconia psittacorum for Flora of Panama
Photo of herbarium specimen at Missouri Botanical Garden, isotype of Heliconia psittacorum

psittacorum
Flora of South America
Plants described in 1782